Dominique Mbonyumutwa (January 1921 – 26 July 1986) was a Rwandan politician who served as the interim first President of Rwanda for a period of nine months in 1961, during a transitional phase between the overthrow of the Rwandan monarchy in the Rwandan Revolution and the country's independence. Following an election in October of that year, he was succeeded by Grégoire Kayibanda who became the first elected president of the country following independence.

Career

On 1 November 1959, while serving as a sous-chef (equivalent to a district mayor today) during the Rwandan monarchy period, Mbonyumutwa was assaulted by a group of Rwandan monarchists in Byimana in Southern Province. This incident triggered the "social revolution" of November 1959.

On 28 January 1961, during a people's congress which abolished the Rwandan monarchy and proclaimed that Rwanda became a social republic, Mbonyumutwa was elected its first President and ran the country until the referendum of 25 September 1961 requested by the UN, after which he resigned (on 26.10 in the same year) to let Grégoire Kayibanda run the country cumulating the function of chief of government and President.

Mbonyumutwa exercised the functions of Magistrate first, then Member of Parliament before holding an honorary position as Chancellor of National Orders in the service of the subsequent president Juvenal Habyarimana. until his death on 26 July 1986.

References

1921 births
1986 deaths
Presidents of Rwanda
Hutu people
Leaders who took power by coup
People from Muhanga District